Badal Nala Railway Station is located in Karachi, Pakistan.

See also
 List of railway stations in Pakistan
 Pakistan Railways

References

Railway stations in Karachi
Railway stations on Karachi–Peshawar Line (ML 1)